Khvoresh Bar (also known as Khūresh and Kūresh Bar) is a village in Bayg Rural District, Bayg District, Torbat-e Heydarieh County, Razavi Khorasan Province, Iran. At the 2006 census, its population was 350, in 93 families.

References 

Populated places in Torbat-e Heydarieh County